Sadikov is a masculine surname, its feminine counterpart being Sadikova. They may refer to
Damir Sadikov (born 1991), Russian football player
Maksud Sadikov (1963–2011), Russian Muslim scholar
Tolibjon Sadikov (1907–1957), Uzbekistani composer
Alisa Sadikova (born 2003), prodigy classical harpist from Russia

See also
Sadykov